Frank Collings (3 November 1872 – 19 February 1950) was a British diver. He competed in the men's 10 metre platform event at the 1908 Summer Olympics.

References

External links
 

1872 births
1950 deaths
British male divers
Olympic divers of Great Britain
Divers at the 1908 Summer Olympics
Place of birth missing